Vayillyam Kunnu Bhagavathi Temple is located at Katampazhipuram, the historical land of Valluvanad Kerala,  away from Palakkad on the way to Cherpulassery.  

Hindu temples in Palakkad district
Bhagavathi temples in Kerala